Benjamin Brown may refer to:

Benjamin Brown (actor) (born 1968), American actor noted for starring in the Disney series Omba Mokomba
Benjamin Brown (artist) (1865–1942), American landscape artist
Benjamin Brown (politician) (1756–1831), member of the 14th United States Congress
Benjamin Brown (developer) (1885–1939), developer of rural communities in New Jersey
Benjamin Brown (Medal of Honor) (1859–1910), American Indian Wars soldier
Benny Brown (1953–1996), American sprinter
Benny Brown (baseball) (fl. 1932), baseball shortstop in the Negro leagues
Benjamin Gratz Brown (1826–1885), American politician
Benjamin Brown (architect) (1890–1974), Canadian architect
Benjamin Brown (scholar) (born 1966), Jewish studies scholar
Benjamin Brown (activist) (1945–1967), African-American student at Jackson State University active in the civil rights movement, killed on campus

See also
Ben Brown (disambiguation)